Bodinbo Island is an islet in the estuarine waters of the River Clyde close to the old ferry slipway at Erskine. Before the dyke or training wall was built the rocky Bodinbo Island was a prominent feature in the river hereabouts and a hazard to shipping, especially sailing craft in the dark, during foggy weather, flood conditions and in high winds. On Ordnance Survey maps the name has been transliterated to Bottombow Island and Boden Boo is the spelling variant used for the nearby woodland plantation.

Islands in the River Clyde

Islands of the River Clyde, rather than sand or mud banks only exposed at low water, once included in order, working upstream towards Glasgow :- Inchgreen in Greenock, Bodinbo, Newshot, Ron, Sand Inch, King's Inch, Buck Inch, White Inch and Water Inch. Green Inch or Milton Island is located at the old Dumbuck Ford near Dumbarton. Colin's Isle once sat in the waters of the Cart near its confluence with the River Clyde.

The name 'Inch' is Scots deriving from the Gaelic 'Innis', an island. The name 'Ron' in Scots refers to  a thicket of hawthorns or rose briers, an area of stunted and crowded woodland. Shot or variants was an ancient unit for a division of land or alternatively a projecting area of land, a peninsula. A 'Shot' also has the meaning of a place from which fishing-nets were cast and in salmon fishing, a part of the river from which nets were cast. The island has a possible fishing weir remnant built across the inner lagoon.

Bodinbo Island

The name 'Bodinbo' is recorded on Timothy Pont's early 17th century map and also on Joan Blaeu's 1662 maps 'Præfectura Renfroana' and 'Levinia Vicecomitatus' that are derived from Pont's work. The island may have been included and named on these maps due to its significance as a hazard to shipping.

John Ainslie's map of 1800 shows the bow-shaped or elipsical island within the flow of the river prior to the construction of the training dike that was built circa 1857  to reduce the width of the river with a view to increasing the water current's scouring of the river bed, making it deeper and less prone to silting up. The Erskine Ferry was operational by this date however at this time it ran from Donald's Quay that lay slightly further downstream.
The old bank of the River Clyde in this area runs close to the Clyde Coastal Path and is lined with trees.

The name may be Scots as both 'Bod' and 'Bo' in place-names mean a sunken rock or as a term for small low-lying rocks on the shoreline. The island was originally bow shaped prior to the silting up of the area behind the training dike.

The OS Name Book gives the "Property Plan Robinson's Chart of R. [River] Clyde. Hugh Paton. Ferry House" as the authority for the name 'Bottombow'.

The surface area of the island is given as 0.768 of an acre or 0.31 of a hectare and the maximum height above high water mark is circa 3m or 9 ft.

An 'Erskine Harbour' is marked on some maps and this has led to a degree of confusion in that the training dike, island and old river course has on occasion been mistakenly identified as a harbour and jetty.

Wildlife
The area is important for its extensive reed beds and diversity of flora. The island's summit lies well above the high water mark and carries typical land based plants such as hawthorn (Crataegus monogyna) shrubs. Brackish water plants dominate the open water saltings and the surrounding silt deposits.

Newshot Nature Reserve lies near by on the banks of the River Clyde facing the old Island of that name.

See also

 Donald's Quay
 King's Inch
 Milton Island
 Newshot Island
 Park Quay
 Rashielee Quay
 St Patrick's Rock
 Sand Inch
 White Inch

References
Notes 

Sources

Moore, John (2017). The Clyde. Mapping the River. Edinburgh : Birlinn Ltd..

External links
 Video footage of Bodinbo Island

Renfrewshire
River islands of Scotland
Islands of the Clyde
Landforms of Renfrewshire
River Clyde
Clyde
Clyde
Clyde
Firth of Clyde
Erskine, Renfrewshire